Monticello Municipal Airport may refer to:

Monticello Municipal Airport (Arkansas), in Monticello, Arkansas, United States (FAA: LLQ).
Monticello Regional Airport, formerly Monticello Municipal Airport, in Monticello, Iowa, United States (FAA: MXO)